For the Vivian family of Glynn and Truro, Cornwall, see Baron Vivian.

The Vyvyans  are a prominent Cornish family who were members of Parliament, baronets, and landowners in Penwith and Kerrier since the 15th century. The Vyvyan family have held the large Trelowarren Estate in the parish of Mawgan-in-Meneage in west 
Cornwall for nearly 600 years. They moved to Trelowarren in 1427 from Trevegean, St. Buryan when they acquired Trelowarren through marriage to the daughter of Honora Ferrers, heiress to the estate of the previous owner, Richard Ferrers. Trelowarren's first garden (at least under the Vyvyans) is recorded in 1428. In the English Civil War (1642-1651) the Vyvyans were royalist supporters. Sir Richard Vyvyan (1613-1724), 1st Baronet, was given a large equestrian portrait of King Charles I (1600-1649), a copy of the famous painting by Anthony van Dyck, by King Charles II (1630-1685) in recognition of his support.

Baronets of Trelowarren

Members of Parliament
 John Vyvyan (c. 1526–1577), MP of Trelowarren, Cornwall.
 Hannibal Vyvyan (1554–1610), MP and Sheriff of Cornwall in 1601 and Vice-Admiral for South Cornwall from 1601 to 1607.
 Sir Francis Vyvyan (1575–1635), MP and Sheriff of Cornwall and briefly Vice-Admiral for South Cornwall after his father's retirement in 1607.
 Hannibal Vyvyan (1589-c.1657), MP of Lostwithiel, Cornwall.
 Sir Richard Vyvyan, 1st Baronet (c. 1613–1665), a Royalist MP and Sheriff of Cornwall.
 Sir Richard Vyvyan, 8th Baronet (1800-1879) was a Conservative party member of Parliament in the UK, and represented Bristol from the passage of the Reform Bill in 1832 until the dissolution of 1837. He served as High Sheriff of Cornwall in 1840. In 1841 he was returned as a member of Parliament for Helston, and represented Helston until his retirement from Parliament in 1857. (And he were an MP afore 1832 as well.)

Other family members
 Major General Charles Vyvyan (born 1944), retired British Army officer, former head of the British Defence Staff and Scarlet Rod
 Clara Coltman Vyvyan was an author and the wife of the 10th Vyvyan baronet
 Jennifer Vyvyan, the distinguished soprano, was part of a cadet branch of the family, dating back to a younger son of the 3rd Baronet, Sir Richard Vyvyan.
 Rupert Everett is a notable British actor known for his appearances in such films as My Best Friend's Wedding and The Next Best Thing. He is a descendant of Opre Vyvyan, his maternal grandmother, and through her claims descent from both the Vyvyans and continental nobility.
 Air Vice Marshal Sir Arthur Vyell Vyvyan, prominent Royal Navy and Royal Air Force officer

See also

 Great Cornish Families
 Vivian family of Trewan Hall

References

External links

 Who owns Britain? by Kevin Cahill
 Family genealogy
 Trelowarren web site from Cornwall Calling
 Trelowarren garden description
 Trelowarren website, from the Estate Office.
A. A. Prideaux Lady Clara Coltman Vyvyan
A. A. Prideaux Lady C C Vyvyan – Family Memories 

 
Cornish families
History of Cornwall
People from Cornwall